Denis Mikolayovich Forov (born 3 December 1984) is a retired Armenian Greco-Roman wrestler. He was on the Ukrainian national wrestling team as a cadet and the Russian national wrestling team as a junior.

He became a Junior European CHampion in 2002 and a Junior World Champion in 2003. Forov won a silver medal at the 2006 European Wrestling Championships. He competed at the 2008 Summer Olympics in the men's Greco-Roman 84 kg division.

Forov was a member of the Armenian Greco-Roman wrestling team at the 2010 Wrestling World Cup. The Armenian team came in third place.

References

External links
Sports-Reference.com

1984 births
Living people
People from Zhmerynka
Armenian male sport wrestlers
Ukrainian male sport wrestlers
Russian male sport wrestlers
Olympic wrestlers of Armenia
Wrestlers at the 2008 Summer Olympics
European Wrestling Championships medalists
Kharkiv State College of Physical Culture 1 alumni
Sportspeople from Vinnytsia Oblast